Éditions de la Table ronde is a French publishing house founded in 1944 by Roland Laudenbach. Since 1996 it has been an imprint of éditions Gallimard.

History 
The company was founded by Roland Laudenbach in 1944 and named by Jean Cocteau. Its first published title was Antigone by Jean Anouilh. After World War II it came to publish several authors who had been blacklisted by the Conseil national des écrivains due to accusations of collaboration or pacifism, such as Henry de Montherlant, Jean Giono and Paul Morand. Its right-wing and anti-Gaullist reputation intensified during the Algerian War. It also published authors such as Claude Mauriac and Henri Troyat, and became associated with the movement les Hussards, and its leading members Antoine Blondin, Michel Déon, Jacques Laurent and Roger Nimier. Other published authors included Marcel Aymé, Henry Muller, Bernard Frank, Roger Stéphane, Jean Freustié, Daniel Boulanger and Alain Bosquet.

A second generation of Table ronde authors included Alphonse Boudard, Gabriel Matzneff, Frédéric Musso and Éric Neuhoff. Laudenbach retired in 1990 and was replaced by Denis Tillinac. He published authors such as Jean-Paul Kauffmann, Jean-Claude Pirotte, Frédérick Tristan, Xavier Patier, William Cliff and Michel Monnereau. Tillinac was succeeded by Alice Déon in 2007. Éditions Gallimard acquired the company in 1958 and it has been an imprint of Gallimard since 1996.

Literary prizes
Literary prizes won by La Table Ronde books have included:
 Prix Renaudot: 1944: Les amitiés particulières (Roger Peyrefitte); 1955: Le Moissonneur d'épines (Georges Govy); 1970: Isabelle ou l'arrière-saison (Jean Freustié); 1977: Les Combattants du petit bonheur (Alphonse Boudard); 2013: Séraphin c'est la fin! (Gabriel Matzneff)
 Grand Prix du roman de l'Académie française: 1955: Les Aristocrates (Michel de Saint-Pierre)
 Prix Interallié: 1959: Un singe en hiver (Antoine Blondin); 1960: Clem (Henry Muller)
 Prix du Livre Inter: 1975: Des demeures et des gens (Catherine d'Etchéa)

Book series

References

External links 
 Official website 

Book publishing companies of France
Publishing companies established in 1944